Pickrell is a surname. Notable people with the surname include:

 E. R. Pickrell (1858–1894), American politician
 Ray Pickrell (1938–2006), English short-circuit motorcycle road racer
 Robert Pickrell (1922–2017), American politician
 Tony Pickrell (1942–2015), Welsh footballer

See also
 Pickrell, Nebraska